Vinodam is a 1996 Indian Telugu-language comedy film directed by S. V. Krishna Reddy. K. Atchi Reddy produced the film under Manisha Films banner. S. V. Krishna Reddy also composed the music for this film. The film stars Srikanth and Ravali.

Plot 
Ashta Lakshmi (Ravali) is the daughter of Bangaram (Kota Srinivasa Rao). He is ready to do anything to make her happy. Four friends (Srikanth, Sivaji Raja, Uttej, Bandla Ganesh) live in a rented house owned by Chintamani (Tanikella Bharani). They frequently deceive their owner by not paying rent to him. They lead a carefree and happy life.

Cast 

 Srikanth as Raja
 Ravali as Ashta Lakshmi "Ala"
 Kota Srinivasa Rao as Bangaram
 Brahmanandam as thief
 Babu Mohan as Bangaram's assistant
 Ali as Bangaram's car driver
 Prakash Raj as Prakash, Bangaram's son-in-law
 Tanikella Bharani as Chintamani
 A. V. S. as A. V. Subrahmanyam
 Sivaji Raja as Raja's friend
 Uttej as Raja's friend
 Bandla Ganesh as Raja's friend
 Mallikarjuna Rao as Malli
 Gundu Hanumantha Rao as Gundu
 Rallapalli as Nageshwara Rao
 Y. Vijaya as Subrahmanyam's wife
 Gautam Raju

Awards 
 Nandi Award for Best Male Comedian – Brahmanandam

Soundtrack

References

External links 

1990s Telugu-language films
1996 comedy films
1996 films
Films directed by S. V. Krishna Reddy
Indian comedy films